Kilkenny Greyhound Stadium is a greyhound racing track located in north-west Kilkenny in Ireland.

The racing takes place on a Wednesday and Friday evenings at 6.30pm. 

St James Park in Kilkenny is a large park that contains sports pitches to the south and a greyhound track to the north. The greyhound circuit can be found south of Parkview Drive off the Freshford Road. Race distances are 300, 325, 550, 727, 750 & 1000 yards.

History
The opening night was on 5 June 1946 and the first ever winner was Rebel Gunner. The following year the Kilkenny management wanted to introduce a major race to bring an identity to the track, they decided on a race over 525 yards and called it the McCalmont Cup. The first Winner in 1947 was a greyhound called Lady Maud who also broke the track record in winning the event. The McCalmont Cup attracted Ireland’s biggest names each time it was held including the three times Irish Greyhound Derby champion Spanish Battleship who claimed the crown in both 1954 & 1955. Two years later in 1957 a greyhound called Prairie Champion took the honours; this brindle would have his name changed to Pigalle Wonder who went on to win the 1958 English Greyhound Derby. 

The circuit has been described as both a good galloping track and too tight which is probably because of the slightly odd shape of the track. In addition to the McCalmont Cup the track hosted two other popular events called the Hurst Cup and Great Whistler Cup. 

Jimmy Kinahan was the Racing Manager when the track opened back in 1946 and remained so until his death in 1978. One of the track bookmakers in the sixties and seventies was the well-known celebrity show jumper Tommy Wade who rode Dundrum. John O'Flynn became Racing and General Manager and stayed with the track for twenty years continuing the long service record of its management. He saw the Bord na gCon buy a minority stake in the track from the Agricultural Society who use the fields at St James Park for agriculture events such as bull sales and show jumping.

In July 2007, the Bord na gCon put aside €8 million for a long awaited regeneration project, the agreement between the Bord na gCon (IGB) and Agricultural Society would allow a new lease, demolition of the old structures and the building of a new grandstand.  However the project did not go ahead and following much deliberation towards the end of 2008 it was decided that the financial position of Kilkenny made it no longer viable to operate. 

After the meeting on 30 January 2009 the track closed its doors until further notice. However a group of local owners, breeders and supporters got together forming the Kilkenny Track Supporters Club and re-opened Kilkenny on 17 May 2009, they met with the IGB and agreed a funding policy and re-laid the entire track surface in addition to installing new rails and a new hare system.

Despite the small nature of the track it is regarded as an important contributor to the local economy and is still supported strongly by the same Kilkenny Track Supporters Club. The long running BEAM race nights have been a success for over 25 years.

Tom Kinane arrived as General Manager and in recent years sponsorship was secured from Red Mills allowing the track to stage the Red Mills Unraced, Red Mills Juvenile and Langton Derby in addition to the prestigious McCalmont Cup.

Competitions
McCalmont Cup (current)
Grand National (former)

Track records
Current
  

Former

References

External links
Irish Greyhound Board

Greyhound racing venues in the Republic of Ireland
Sport in County Kilkenny